Cuba Crossing, also known as Assignment: Kill Castro, Kill Castro, and Sweet Dirty Tony, is a 1980 German/American international co-production action film directed by Chuck Workman and distributed by Troma Entertainment. It was produced by Wolfgang Bellenbaum and Jack White and stars Stuart Whitman, Robert Vaughn, Woody Strode, Albert Salmi, Sybil Danning, Michael Gazzo, and White's then wife Marie-Louise Gassen.

Plot
Hud is an American who survived the Bay of Pigs Invasion and has sworn revenge against Fidel Castro.  Many years later, he gets his chance when he is engaged by Mr Rossellini, who blames Castro for his losses when his gambling enterprises and he had to leave Cuba, and the mysterious Mr. Bell, who finances Hud for a mission to Cuba.  Hud plans to bring a father-and-son pair of sharpshooters to kill Castro when he stays at a hotel on the Isla de Pinos.  Through Rossellini, Hud hires bar owner and ship's captain Tony to bring his men ashore, but the enterprise is fraught with betrayal.

Cast
 Stuart Whitman as Tony
 Robert Vaughn as Hud
 Woody Strode as Titi
 Albert Salmi as Delgato
 Michael Gazzo as Rossellini
 Marie-Louise Gassen as Maria
 Edward Bell as Michael
 Raymond St. Jacques as Mr. Bell
 Sybil Danning as Veronica
 Caren Kaye as Tracy
 Monti Rock the III as Man at Bar 
 Bert Williams as 1st Marksman
 Sharon Thomas as Fred

Production
Cuba Crossing was filmed in Key West, Florida.

Release
Cuba Crossing was released February 23, 1980 in theatres in West Germany. The film was released on VHS on April 15, 1980. Cuba Crossing was released on DVD March 1, 2005, initially and recently on February 5, 2016.

References

Sources

External links

 

1980 films
American political thriller films
American independent films
West German films
Troma Entertainment films
1980 action thriller films
Films set in Florida
Films shot in Florida
Cold War films
Films set in Cuba
Films with screenplays by Robin Swicord
English-language German films
1980s English-language films
1980s American films